Figures of Speech is a hip hop group consisting of emcees "Eve" (Ava DuVernay) and Jyant. They performed at the Good Life Cafe in the early 1990s  and were featured on the Project Blowed compilation.

Eve went on to direct the feature-length documentary about the Good Life open-mic nights titled This Is the Life (2008). She later directed the feature films Selma, 13th, and A Wrinkle in Time, as well as the Family Feud music video for Jay-Z featuring Beyoncé.

Discography 
In 2007, Figures of Speech released their first album The Last Word exclusively on iTunes.

References

External links 
 Interview with Ava Duvernay 2008
 

American hip hop groups